The Aldwych Theatre is a West End theatre, located in Aldwych in the City of Westminster, central London. It was listed Grade II on 20 July 1971. Its seating capacity is 1,200 on three levels.

History

Origins
The theatre was constructed in the newly built Aldwych as a pair with the Waldorf Theatre, now known as the Novello Theatre. Both buildings were designed in the Edwardian Baroque style by W. G. R. Sprague. The Aldwych Theatre was funded by Seymour Hicks in association with the American impresario Charles Frohman, and built by Walter Wallis of Balham.

The theatre opened on 23 December 1905 with a production of Blue Bell, a new version of Hicks's popular pantomime Bluebell in Fairyland. In 1906, Hicks's The Beauty of Bath, followed in 1907 by The Gay Gordons, played at the theatre. In February 1913, the theatre was used by Serge Diaghilev and Vaslav Nijinsky for the first rehearsals of Le Sacre du Printemps before its première in Paris during May. In 1920, Basil Rathbone played Major Wharton in The Unknown.

From 1923 to 1933, the theatre was the home of the series of twelve farces, known as the Aldwych farces, most of which were written by Ben Travers. Members of the regular company for these farces included Ralph Lynn, Tom Walls, Ethel Coleridge, Gordon James, Mary Brough, Winifred Shotter and Robertson Hare. In 1933, Richard Tauber presented and starred in a new version of Das Dreimäderlhaus at the Aldwych under the title Lilac Time.  From the mid-1930s until about 1960, the theatre was owned by the Abrahams family.

Post-war years and the Royal Shakespeare Company
In 1949, Laurence Olivier directed the first London production of Tennessee Williams' A Streetcar Named Desire at the Aldwych Theatre. Starring as Blanche DuBois was Olivier's wife Vivien Leigh, who later won an Academy Award for the role in the 1951 film of Williams' play. Bonar Colleano co-starred as Stanley.

On 15 December 1960, after intense speculation, it was announced that the Royal Shakespeare Company, headquartered in Stratford-upon-Avon and under the directorship of Peter Hall (director) was to make the Aldwych Theatre its base in London for the next three years. In the event the company stayed for over 20 years, finally moving to the Barbican Arts Centre in 1982. The theatre was sold to the Nederlander Organization immediately afterwards. Among numerous RSC productions staged at this venue were The Wars of the Roses, "Ondine" with Peter Hall's wife Leslie Caron, The Greeks, and Nicholas Nickleby, as well as the transfer of most of the Shakespeare productions that were first staged at the RSC's Shakespeare Memorial Theatre in Stratford.  During absences of the RSC, the theatre hosted the annual World Theatre Seasons, foreign plays in their original productions, invited to London by the theatre impresario Peter Daubeny, annually from 1964 to 1973 and finally in 1975. For his involvement with these Aldwych seasons, run without Arts Council or other official support, Daubeny won the Evening Standard special award in 1972.

In 1990–91, Joan Collins starred in a revival of Private Lives at the Aldwych.  The theatre is referred to in Julio Cortázar's short story Instructions for John Howell (Instrucciones para John Howell) in the anthology All Fires the Fire (Todos los fuegos el fuego).

21st century

Since 2000, the theatre has hosted a mixture of plays, comedies and musical theatre productions.  Andrew Lloyd Webber's musical Whistle Down the Wind played until 2001, and Fame enjoyed an extended run from 2002 to 2006.  From 2006 to 2011, it was the home to the British musical version of Dirty Dancing. Beautiful: The Carole King Musical ran from 2015 to 2017.

In March 2018, the theatre opened the world premiere of Tina: The Tina Turner Musical.

Productions
 The Beauty of Bath (1906)
 The Gay Gordons (1907)
 It Pays to Advertise (1923)
 A Cuckoo in the Nest (1925)
 Rookery Nook (1926)
 Thark (1927)
 Plunder (1928)
 A Cup of Kindness (1929)
 A Night Like This (1930)
 Little Ladyship (1939)
 Nap Hand (1940)
 Jane (1947)
 Letter from Paris (1952)
 The Whole Truth (1955)
 Man Alive (1955)
 The Collection (1962) by Harold Pinter 
 A Penny for a Song (1962) by John Whiting
 The Homecoming (1965) by Pinter
 Old Times (1971) by Pinter
 The Balcony (1971) by Jean Genet 
 Travesties (1974) by Tom Stoppard 
 Private Lives (1990/91) by Noel Coward starring Joan Collins
 The Importance of Being Earnest (1993) by Oscar Wilde 
 An Inspector Calls (1993–1995)
 Indian Ink (1995–1996) by Stoppard
 Whistle Down The Wind (1998–2001) by Andrew Lloyd Webber and Jim Steinman
 The Secret Garden (2001) by Lucy Simon and Marsha Norman
 Fame – The Musical (2002–2006) by Jacques Levy and Steve Margoshes
 Dirty Dancing – The Classic Story on Stage (2006–2011), by Eleanor Bergstein
Top Hat (2012–2013)
 Stephen Ward (2013), music by Andrew Lloyd Webber
 Beautiful: The Carole King Musical (2015–2017), featuring the music of Carole King
 Tina: The Tina Turner Musical (2018–present), featuring the music of Tina Turner

Recent and current productions
 A Round-Heeled Woman (30 November 2011 – 14 January 2012) 
 Top Hat the Musical (April 2012 – 26 October 2013) by Irving Berlin
 Stephen Ward the Musical (December 2013 – March 2014) by Andrew Lloyd Webber, Don Black and Christopher Hampton
 Beautiful: The Carole King Musical (25 February 2015 – 5 August 2017)
La Soirée (16 November 2017 - 5 February 2018)
Tina: The Tina Turner Musical (21 March 2018 – present)

Notes

References
 Who's Who in the Theatre, edited by John Parker, tenth edition, revised, London, 1947, p. 1183.
 The Oxford Companion to the Theatre Fourth edition, edited by Phyllis Hartnoll, Oxford, 1983
 Guide to British Theatres 1750–1950, John Earl and Michael Sell pp. 97–8 (Theatres Trust, 2000)

Nearby tube stations
Covent Garden
Holborn

External links

 
 History of the Aldwych Theatre

West End theatres
Theatres in the City of Westminster
Grade II listed buildings in the City of Westminster
Grade II listed theatres
Theatres completed in 1905
Aldwych farce
Edwardian architecture in London
Aldwych
1905 establishments in England